Natalia Paderina nee Natalia Akhmertdinova (born November 1, 1975 in Sverdlovsk, Russian SFSR, Soviet Union) is a Russian sport shooter. She won the silver medal in Women's 10m air pistol at the 2008 Summer Olympics. At that event, she shared the podium with bronze medalist Nino Salukvadze of Georgia. Georgia and Russia were at war at the time. They hugged and shook hands, which was seen as a peaceful gesture.

References

External links
 

1975 births
Living people
Russian female sport shooters
ISSF pistol shooters
Olympic shooters of Russia
Shooters at the 2004 Summer Olympics
Shooters at the 2008 Summer Olympics
Shooters at the 2012 Summer Olympics
Olympic silver medalists for Russia
Sportspeople from Yekaterinburg
Olympic medalists in shooting
Medalists at the 2008 Summer Olympics